The Maldives Film Awards are presented by Maldives Film Association to honour both artistic and technical excellence of professionals in the Maldivian film industry. The ceremony had been sponsored by various private organizations in the past including Enchanteur and Ilsha. A live ceremony was broadcast to television audiences.

History
The Maldives Film Awards were first introduced in 2011. In the first awards function, held on 2 July 2011, awards were given to films released in 2008 and 2009; picked from 5th Gaumee Film Awards held in 2007. 

The association attempted to host the fourth edition of the award in 2016, but it was cancelled following several delays. Later in 2020, the association announced the fourth ceremony of the award which got delayed further due to the COVID-19 pandemic.

Awards 
Awards are given in the following categories. Follow the links for lists of the award winners, year by year.

Feature films

Short films 
 Maldives Film Award for Best Film
 Maldives Film Award for Best Director
 Maldives Film Award for Best Actor
 Maldives Film Award for Best Actress
 Best Supporting Actor
 Best Supporting Actress
 Best Editing
 Best Cinematography
 Best Screenplay
 Best Makeup

Special awards 
 Lifetime Achievement Award

References

Maldives Film Awards
Awards established in 2011
2011 establishments in the Maldives